Sebastian Nava (born March 10, 2003) is an American soccer player who plays as a forward for Portland Pilots.

Career

LA Galaxy II
As a member of the LA Galaxy youth academy, Nava appeared for the club's USL Championship affiliate LA Galaxy II during the 2020 and 2021 seasons. He made his professional debut on July 11, 2020 in a 4-0 defeat to the Phoenix Rising.

College
In September 2020, Nava committed to play at the University of Portland beginning in the fall of 2021.

Career statistics

Club

References

External links
Sebastian Nava at US Soccer Development Academy

2003 births
Living people
LA Galaxy II players
USL Championship players
American soccer players
Association football forwards
Soccer players from Los Angeles
Portland Pilots men's soccer players